The 1893 Tulane Olive and Blue football team represented Tulane University during the 1893 college football season and was the first team at Tulane to play intercollegiate games.

Schedule

References

Tulane
Tulane Green Wave football seasons
Tulane Olive and Blue football